Warian dos Santos Souza (born 14 June 1996 in Belém), known as Warian Santos or just Warian, is a Brazilian footballer. He currently plays for Sampaio Corrêa.

Honours

Remo
Campeonato Paraense: 2014, 2015

References

External links
 Warian Santos at playmakerstats.com (English version of ogol.com.br)
 

1996 births
Living people
Brazilian footballers
Clube do Remo players
Sport Club Corinthians Paulista players
Atlético Clube Goianiense players
Clube de Regatas Brasil players
Associação Desportiva São Caetano players
Sampaio Corrêa Futebol Clube players
Association football midfielders
Sportspeople from Belém